Rengsdorf-Waldbreitbach is a Verbandsgemeinde ("collective municipality") in the district of Neuwied, in Rhineland-Palatinate, Germany. The seat of the Verbandsgemeinde is in Rengsdorf. It was formed on 1 January 2018 by the merger of the former Verbandsgemeinden Rengsdorf and Waldbreitbach.

The Verbandsgemeinde Rengsdorf-Waldbreitbach consists of the following Ortsgemeinden ("local municipalities"):

 Anhausen 
 Bonefeld 
 Breitscheid 
 Datzeroth 
 Ehlscheid 
 Hardert 
 Hausen (Wied) 
 Hümmerich 
 Kurtscheid 
 Meinborn 
 Melsbach 
 Niederbreitbach 
 Oberhonnefeld-Gierend 
 Oberraden 
 Rengsdorf
 Roßbach 
 Rüscheid 
 Straßenhaus 
 Thalhausen
 Waldbreitbach

Verbandsgemeinde in Rhineland-Palatinate